Znaki na drodze is a 1970 Polish drama film directed by . The film won the Golden Leopard at the Locarno International Film Festival.

Cast
 Tadeusz Janczar as Michal Biel
 Galina Polskikh as Jadwiga
 Leon Niemczyk as Paslawski
 Leszek Drogosz as Stefan Jaksonek
 Bolesław Abart as Driver Sosin
 Arkadiusz Bazak as Marian
 Ewa Ciepiela as Helena
 Janusz Kłosiński as Mechanic Franciszek Wasko
 Ryszard Kotys as Mechanic Bulaga
 Zygmunt Malanowicz as Lieutenant
 Jan Peszek as Driver Bakalarzewicz
 Jerzy Block as Porter Kurek

References

External links
 

1970 films
1970 drama films
Polish drama films
1970s Polish-language films
Golden Leopard winners